William Turner (born c. 1866) was a Scottish footballer who played as a forward.

Career
Turner played club football for Pollokshields Athletic, and made two appearances for Scotland, scoring one goal.

References

1866 births
Year of birth uncertain
Scottish footballers
Scotland international footballers
Pollokshields Athletic F.C. players
Association football forwards
Place of birth missing
Year of death missing
Place of death missing